Bog is a 1979 American independent horror film directed by Don Keeslar and starring Gloria DeHaven, Aldo Ray, Marshall Thompson, and Leo Gordon.

Plot

Dynamite fishing in a rural swamp revives a prehistoric gill monster that lives on the blood of human females. When a local is fishing with dynamite in Bog Lake, something larger pops to the surface: a green bug-eyed monster awakened from a long sleep, which promptly begins killing fishermen who stumble across its lair. When biologist Ginny Glenn (Gloria DeHaven) discovers the creature's evolutionary nature, the local sheriff decides to use various methods to destroy the beast. Eventually the monster is killed after it is rammed with a truck, but its eggs remain.

Cast
 Gloria DeHaven as Ginny Glenn / Adrianna
 Aldo Ray as Sheriff Neal Rydholm
 Marshall Thompson as Dr. Brad Wednesday
 Leo Gordon as Dr. John Warren
 Glen Voros as Alan Tanner
 Rohay North as Chuck Pierce
 Carol Terry as May Tanner
 Lou Hunt as Kim Pierce
 Ed Clark as Deputy Jensen
 Robert Fry as Wallace Fry
 Leroy Winbush as Terry Taylor
 Dan Killian as Bill Beckley
 Don Daniel as Jim Hotchkiss
 Charles Pitt as Deputy Corbett
 Chris Harris as Deputy Siegel

Release
The film was given a limited release theatrically in the United States by Marshall Films in 1979.  It was subsequently released on VHS by Prism Entertainment Corporation. The film was released on DVD by Trinity Home Entertainment on Nov 1, 2005 and in Canada later that year by Maple Pictures. It was released twice by Allegro Corporation, both in 2011.

Reception

Leonard Maltin awarded the film 1 star or BOMB, calling the film "Ultra-cheap" and "[an] ultra-bad time-killer".
In his book Horror Films of the 1970s, film critic and independent filmmaker John Kenneth Muir gave the film 1 out of a possible 4 stars. In his review, Muir wrote, "They don't make movies like Bog anymore and we can all be grateful for that. This is a monster film made by people with only the most rudimentary knowledge of how to assemble a film. It is poorly acted, shot, written, and edited. It also commits the cardinal sin of being boring."

References

External links
 
 
 

1979 films
1979 horror films
1970s monster movies
1970s English-language films
American independent films
American monster movies
American supernatural horror films
1980s English-language films
1970s American films